The 2020–21 season is Pallacanestro Varese's 77th in existence and the club's 13th consecutive season in the top tier Italian basketball.

Kit 
Supplier: Macron / Sponsor: Openjobmetis

Players

Current roster

Depth chart

Squad changes

In 

|}

Out 

|}

–

Confirmed 

|}

Coach

Competitions

Supercup

Serie A

References 

2021–22 in Italian basketball by club